The Hitchin Flyover is a grade-separated single-track railway viaduct near Hitchin, Hertfordshire, England, which carries the Down Cambridge Flyover line over the East Coast Main Line. Constructed between 2012 and 2013, it connects the westernmost track of the East Coast Main Line with the Cambridge line. The flyover was built to increase the throughput at Cambridge Junction, a congested flat junction, which put severe constraints on capacity on both lines.

History
Proposals as part of the original electrification work in the early 1970s envisaged a new underpass here and land was set aside for its construction. However, budgetary constraints forced this part of the programme to be abandoned. The land stood empty for many years, but has since been used to provide new housing.

A new plan and subsequent application for an order to build a flyover was approved after a Planning Inspectorate report and public inquiry between 11 and 25 May 2010.

Construction was completed in June 2013. The chalk was quarried from just beyond the ancient Icknield Way, which at this point is a public bridlepath between Ickleford and Letchworth Garden City, and the contractor was required to refill and replant the quarry afterwards.

Since the embankment materials were locally sourced it also meant that the new embankment was effectively pre-seeded with poppies. This means the entire embankment is covered in red poppies during their flowering season giving the name to the location 'Poppy Bank'.

Design

The scheme, which can be used by passengers services and heavy freight, has created a new single-track line that diverges from the northbound slow line at Hitchin North Junction just beyond Hitchin station, using a short embankment section of the former Bedford to Hitchin Line, a section of which was cleared of vegetation and made progressively higher, to form a short ramp.

Although this routing skirts around the flat junction in a curve that takes trains over a physically longer distance, it removes the need for them to dwell at Hitchin – sometimes for several minutes – awaiting a path across the tracks of the main London–Peterborough route, thus decreasing the overall journey time to Cambridge in many instances. The scheme improves the punctuality and reliability of both the London–Cambridge and London–Peterborough routes, the latter because Peterborough-bound stopping trains are no longer delayed if running closely behind a Cambridge service being held at Hitchin waiting to cross the flat junction.

The flat junction remains in use, providing an alternative route from either the Down Fast or Down Slow line to the Cambridge line.

Operation

On 26 June 2013, passenger services began to use the flyover, with up to three services per day using it during regular service and driver training. The flyover came into full use in December 2013 with the introduction of the new timetable.

Trains to Letchworth and Cambridge are timetabled to take one minute longer than in the reverse direction. For example, trains from King's Cross to Cambridge which used to leave at XX.15 now leave at XX.14.

By January 2015 the only form of traction not to have used the flyover was electric locomotives (regular services are electric multiple units); Union of South Africa became the first steam locomotive on the flyover when it moved empty coaching stock to Cambridge in preparation for a tour to York.

References

Rail junctions in England
Rail transport in Hertfordshire
Railway viaducts in Hertfordshire
Buildings and structures in Hitchin
East Coast Main Line